Not on Our Watch was a nongovernmental, international relief and humanitarian aid organization based in the United States.

History
The organization was established by Don Cheadle, George Clooney, Matt Damon, Brad Pitt, David Pressman, and Jerry Weintraub in 2008, to bring global attention to human rights violations in Darfur and beyond, while providing resources to assist in putting an end to mass atrocities around the world. The organization has its roots in the book Not on Our Watch written by Don Cheadle and human rights activist John Prendergast, who was also a board member and served as the organization's strategic advisor.

Merge
In February 2019, Not on Our Watch merged with and was renamed The Sentry (founded in 2016 by Clooney and Prendergast), with the board of directors and scope of work remaining the same. The old website remains active as an archive.

Activities 
Not On Our Watch enlisted the support of artists, activists, and cultural leaders to raise awareness of its activities while partnering directly with the Satellite Sentinel Project, co-founded by George Clooney and John Prendergast.

References

External links 
 Not On Our Watch (first version of website, 2007)
 The Sentry

Charities based in California
Matt Damon
Foreign charities operating in Sudan